Solinair d.o.o. is a Slovenian airline based at Ljubljana Jože Pučnik Airport. It mainly operates charter cargo services for various logistics companies such as DHL and also offers aircraft maintenance.

Overview 

The airline was established and started operations in 1991. In July 2015, Solinair laid off its entire fleet. While one Saab 340 was returned to its lessor, two Boeing 737-400Fs have been sold for unknown reasons. Since September 2015, Solinair has been operating Airbus A300-600RF aircraft.

Destinations 
Solinair operates ad-hoc cargo charter flights on behalf of other airlines and logistics companies as well as ACMI services.

Fleet

Current fleet 
As of November 2021, the Solinair fleet consists of the following aircraft:

Historic fleet 
Solinair also used to operate the following aircraft types:
 Let L-410 Turbolet
 Boeing 737-400F
 Saab 340F

References

External links 

Official website

Airlines of Slovenia
Airlines established in 1991
Cargo airlines
Slovenian companies established in 1991